Ivar Skjånes (5 March 1888, Kolvereid – 5 June 1975, Trondheim) was a Norwegian politician for the Labour Party.

Skjånes became mayor of Trondheim, the third largest city in Norway, in 1935. On 31 October 1940, during the German occupation of Norway, he was removed on the orders of the occupants. He was also imprisoned, first from March to May 1942 in Falstad concentration camp. In September 1944 he was arrested again and incarcerated in Vollan concentration camp until October, then in Berg concentration camp until 29 March 1945. When the occupation ended in 1945, he assumed office again. He left in 1952. In 1948 he was appointed as County Governor of Sør-Trøndelag, which he held to 1958.

Ivar Skjånes was biographed in 2002 (Røde dager og blå timer : Ivar Skjånes 1888-1975 : et liv og en epoke).

He had a daughter Bodil Skjånes Dugstad and a son.

References

1888 births
1975 deaths
Norwegian resistance members
Falstad concentration camp survivors
Vollan concentration camp survivors
Berg concentration camp survivors
Mayors of Trondheim
Labour Party (Norway) politicians
County governors of Norway